Prysk is a municipality in Česká Lípa District in the Liberec Region of the Czech Republic. It has about 400 inhabitants.

Administrative parts
The municipality is made up of villages of Dolní Prysk, Horní Prysk and Vesnička.

History
The first written mention of Prysk is from 1382.

References

Villages in Česká Lípa District